The Valle de Oro National Wildlife Refuge is a protected area in New Mexico managed by the United States Fish and Wildlife Service as part of the National Wildlife Refuge System. This unit abuts the Rio Grande Valley State Park, which is adjacent to the Rio Grande.

Hours
Property hours 6:00 AM to 6:00 PM Monday through Sunday. Breezeway single stall bathroom is open to public use from 6:00 AM to 6:00 PM Monday through Sunday. Visitor center remains closed for health and safety reasons. Please use the new driveway to enter the refuge and park in the new parking lot.

History
The land that is presently Valle de Oro National Wildlife Refuge was operated for decades as a dairy farm. After the closure of this facility, this area was dominated by alfalfa and fescue fields, it became seen as a potential development site for suburban homes until its purchase by the Trust for Public Land was negotiated.  In 2011, the site was earmarked for federal improvements, and in 2012 it was transferred to the U.S. Fish & Wildlife Service.

A working farm remains at Valle de Oro NWR, with the on-premises agricultural setting transitioning into native Middle Rio Grande Valley habitats for resident and migratory wildlife. Federal administrators plan to extend the bosque (riparian forest of the Rio Grande) onto the refuge.

Valle de Oro NWR is designated as an Urban National Wildlife Refuge, due to its proximity to Albuquerque.  It is the U.S. Fish & Wildlife Service's first Urban NWR in its Southwest region to be built from the ground up under the new Urban Wildlife Conservation Program's Standards of Excellence.

References

National Wildlife Refuges in New Mexico
Protected areas established in 2012